The 2018 CS U.S. International Figure Skating Classic was held in September 2018 in Salt Lake City, Utah. It was part of the 2018–19 ISU Challenger Series. Medals were awarded in the disciplines of men's singles, ladies' singles, pair skating, and ice dancing.

Entries
The International Skating Union published the list of entries on August 17, 2018.

Changes to preliminary assignments

Results

Men

Ladies

Pairs

Ice dancing

References

External links
 
 2018 U.S. International Figure Skating Classic at the International Skating Union

2018
2018 in figure skating
2018 in sports in Utah
Sports in Salt Lake City
CS U.S. International